Cystoopsidae is a family of nematodes belonging to the order Trichocephalida.

Genera:
 Cystoopsis Wagner, 1867
 Dioctowittus Chabaud & Hoa, 1960

References

Nematodes